Iyulsky (masculine), Iyulskaya (feminine), or Iyulskoye (neuter) is the name of several rural localities in Russia:
Iyulskoye, Kaliningrad Oblast, a settlement in Turgenevsky Rural Okrug of Polessky District of Kaliningrad Oblast
Iyulskoye, Udmurt Republic, a selo in Iyulsky Selsoviet of Votkinsky District of the Udmurt Republic